Two ships of the United States Navy have borne the name USS Sargo, named in honor of the sargo, a food and gamefish of the porgy family, inhabiting coastal waters of the southern United States.

 The first , was the lead ship of her class of submarine, commissioned in 1939 and struck in 1946.

United States Navy ship names